This is a list of all people who have served as Illinois Territorial Secretary and Illinois Secretary of State.

Territorial Secretary
Secretaries of the Illinois Territory were appointed by the President of the United States with the advice and consent of the United States Senate.  Nathaniel Pope became left after being elected as the territory's non-voting delegate to Congress.

Secretary of State
Secretaries of State before 1848 were appointed by governors; Horace S. Cooley was both appointed by Governor French under that system, and retained in office by election under the 1848 Constitution.

Each officer holder is listed with his home county as given in the Illinois Blue Book.

See also
 List of Illinois state legislatures

References

External links 
 Illinois Secretary of State – official website

Secretaries of State